is a Japanese game character designer and manga artist. She joined the game company Nihon Falcom in 1993. After she turned freelance, she took on illustrations of light novels and character designs for the Rune Factory series.

Main works

Character design 
The Legend of Heroes III: Shiroki (PC-98, Nihon Falcom)
Brandish 3: Spirit of Balcan (PC-98, Nihon Falcom)
Revival Xanadu (PC-98, Nihon Falcom)
The Legend of Xanadu II (PC Engine, Nihon Falcom)
Ys V: Ushinawareta Suna no Miyako Kefin (Super Famicom, Nihon Falcom)
The Legend of Heroes IV: Akai Shizuku (PC-98, Nihon Falcom)
Ys I & II eternal (Windows, Nihon Falcom)
The Legend of Heroes: A Tear of Vermillion (PSP, Nihon Falcom)
Rune Factory: A Fantasy Harvest Moon (Nintendo DS, Marvelous Interactive)
The Legend of Heroes II: Prophecy of the Moonlight Witch (PSP, Nihon Falcom)
Rune Factory 2 (Nintendo DS, Marvelous Interactive)
Rune Factory Frontier (Nintendo Wii, Marvelous Interactive)
Rune Factory 3 (Nintendo DS, Marvelous Interactive)
Rune Factory: Tides of Destiny (Nintendo Wii/PS3, Marvelous Interactive)
Rune Factory 4 (Nintendo 3DS, Marvelous Interactive)
L2 Love x Loop (PS2, Otomate/Idea Factory)
Rune Factory 5 (Nintendo Switch, Marvelous Interactive)
Rear Sekai (Nintendo Switch, Bushiroad Games)

Illustration 
Sora no Kane no Hibiku Hoshi de series
Kamen Rider Hibiki (novel version)

Manga 
Hariduki Kagerou Enishie Monogatari

Artbook 
Minako Iwasaki ARTWORKS (July 1, 2006)

References

External links 
 GREAT ESCAPE — Minako Iwasaki's website

Japanese illustrators
Living people
Year of birth missing (living people)